Sahasam ( Adventure) is a 1992 Telugu-language action film, produced by M. V. Rao under the Sridevi Productions banner and directed by Suresh Krishna. It stars Jagapathi Babu, Bhanu Chander, Saranya, Kaveri  and music composed by M. M. Keeravani.

Plot
The film begins with two stout-hearted cops Bhanu & Chandu who thwart the felonious deeds of MLA Maruthi Rao and his sibling Sanjay. Ongoing they find their love interests Usha the daughter of Commissioner Prabhakar & Rekha a lecturer. Once Rekha spots an alleged offense of Sanjay and gets ahead as a witness. Ergo, she burnt lively when Chandu outbursts on Sanjay and is slaughtered. Now Bhanu commences an investigation and accumulates attests that are smashed by blackguards. Hence, enraged Bhanu knocks out the lawbreakers by hanging them publicly. At last, the judiciary acquits Bhanu as proof is absent. Finally, the movie ends with Bhanu persistently doing his duty.

Cast

 Jagapathi Babu as Inspector Chandu 
 Bhanu Chander as Inspector Bhanu 
 Saranya as Rekha
 Kaveri as Usha
 Gollapudi Maruthi Rao as MLA Maruthi Rao
 Nassar as Sanjay
 Chandra Mohan as C.M. Ram Mohan Rao
 Prabhakar Reddy as Lawyer
 Ranganath as Commissioner Prabhakar
 Giri Babu as Chencal Rao
 Rallapalli as Constable Venkata Swamy
 Sakshi Ranga Rao
 Misro as Journalist Gandhi
 Chitti Babu as Gopi
 Kallu Chidambaram 
 Annapurna
 Radha Kumari
 Anitha

Soundtrack

Music composed by M. M. Keeravani.  Music released on SURYA Audio Company.

References

External links
 

1992 films
Films directed by Suresh Krissna
Films scored by M. M. Keeravani
1990s Telugu-language films